Espoo Cathedral is a medieval stone church in Espoo, Finland, and the seat of the Diocese of Espoo of the Evangelical Lutheran Church of Finland. The cathedral is located in the district of Espoon keskus, near the Espoonjoki river. The oldest parts of the church were completed in the 1480s and it is thus the oldest preserved building in the city. 
The church became a cathedral in 2004 after the Diocese of Espoo was split off from the Diocese of Helsinki. The cathedral grounds include a graveyard, a vicarage and a parish hall completed in 1995. In addition to being the seat of the Diocese of Espoo, it serves as the church for the Espoo Cathedral Parish and hosts various concerts and other events including the "Organ Night and Aria" concert series.

History 

The church was originally designed in the late 15th century by an unknown "Espoo master" and built between 1485 and 1490 under his supervision. The only remaining parts of the medieval church are the eastern and western parts of the nave. The weapons room was removed between 1804 and 1806 and certain other parts of the church, including the original sacristy, were taken apart between 1821 and 1823 when the building was converted into a more spacious cruciform church.

The vaults and walls of the older parts of the cathedral are decorated with murals, largely painted in the 1510s, that depict both biblical scenes and events in the daily life of the people. The paintings were covered in the 18th century as they were thought to be "crude and superstitious" but uncovered again and conserved during renovations in 1931. The current campanile of the cathedral was completed in 1767 and its top part was redone between 1868 and 1869.

Image gallery

References

Further reading 
 Hiekkanen, Markus (1988). Polvesta polveen täällä : Espoon kirkon esiinkaivettua menneisyyttä. Espoo: Espoon seurakunnat. . 
 Hiekkanen, Markus (1994). The Stone Churches of the Medieval Diocese of Turku : A Systematic Classification and Chronology Helsinki. .

External links 

 History 

Churches completed in 1490
15th-century churches in Finland
Buildings and structures in Espoo
Lutheran cathedrals in Finland
Gothic architecture in Finland
Tourist attractions in Uusimaa